The Grand Bauhinia Medal is the highest award under the Hong Kong honours and awards system;  it is to recognise the selected person's lifelong and highly significant contribution to the well-being of Hong Kong. The awardee is entitled to the postnominal letters GBM and the style The Honourable.  The award was created in 1997 to replace the British honours system, following the transfer of sovereignty to the People's Republic of China and the establishment of the Hong Kong Special Administrative Region. The list was empty because no one awarded from 2003 to 2004. Bauhinia, Bauhinia blakeana, is the floral emblem of Hong Kong.

List of recipients

1997 
 Ann Tse-kai
 Lee Quo-wei
 Simon Li
 Elsie Tu
 Cha Chi Ming
 Tsui Sze-man
 Chuang Shih-ping
 Wong Ker-lee
 Tsang Hin-chi
 Henry Fok
 Chung Sze-yuen
 Lo Tak-shing

1998 
 Arnaldo de Oliveira Sales
 Ng Hong-mun
 Run Run Shaw
 Wong Po-yan

1999 
 Lee Chark-tim
 Anson Chan
 Yang Ti-liang
 Sidney Gordon
 William Purves

2000 
 Henry Litton
 Charles Ching
 Mo Kwan-nin
 Jin Yong
 Jao Tsung-I

2001 
 Harry Fang
 Li Ka-shing
 Yeung Kwong

2002 
 Donald Tsang
 Elsie Leung
 David Akers-Jones
 Chang-Lin Tien

2005 
 Lau Wong-fat
 Chiang Chen

2006 
 Charles Lee
 Leo Lee Tung-hai
 Tung Chee Hwa

2007 
 Rita Fan
 Rafael Hui (Revoked in 2018)
 David Li
 Lee Shau-kee

2008 
 Andrew Li
 Henry Hu
 Cheng Yu-tung
 Chan Sui-kau

2009 
 Henry Tang
 Hari Harilela
 Joseph Yam

2010 
 John Tsang
 Ronald Arculli
 Edward Leong
 Stanley Ho
 Victor Fung
 Tin Ka Ping
 Charles K. Kao

2011 
 Leung Chun-ying
 Allan Zeman

2012 
 Geoffrey Ma
 Stephen Lam
 Wong Yan-lung
 Kemal Bokhary
 Peter Woo
 Lui Che-woo

2013 
 Patrick Chan
 Anthony Mason
 Sik Kok Kwong 
 Maria Tam

2014 
 Jose Yu
 Charles Ho

2015 
 Jasper Tsang
 Cheng Yiu-tong
 Ho Sai-chu
 Li Dak-sum

2016 
 Carrie Lam 
 Tam Yiu-chung 
 Chan Wing-kee 
 Victor Lo
 Hu Fa-kuang 
 Moses Cheng 
 Lap-Chee Tsui

2017 
 Matthew Cheung
 Paul Chan Mo-po
 Rimsky Yuen
 Laura Cha
 Arthur Li
 Fanny Law
 Ip Kwok-him
 Vincent Lo
 Henry Cheng
 Tai Tak-fung
 Jack So
 Ronnie Chan

2018 
 Robert Tang
 Cheung Hok-ming
 Robin Chan
 Rosie Young Tse-tse

2019 
 Yu Kwok-chun
 Albert Hung Chao-hong

2020 
 Andrew Leung
 Bernard Charnwut Chan
 Chan Tung
 Xu Rongmao

2021 
 Andrew Cheung
 Teresa Cheng
 Chow Chung-kong
 Regina Ip
 Bunny Chan
 Jonathan Choi Koon-shum
 Lo Man-tuen

2022 

 John Lee
 Tommy Cheung
 Roberto Ribeiro
 Andrew Liao
 Wilfred Wong Ying-wai
 Peter Lam
 Ng Leung-ho

See also 
Orders, decorations, and medals of Hong Kong

References 

Orders, decorations, and medals of Hong Kong
Lists of Hong Kong people
 
Awards established in 1997